The Police Exemplary Service Medal is a Canadian service medal for police officers.  The medal honours 20 years of full-time exemplary service by police officers serving with one or more recognized Canadian police forces. The medal may also be awarded in extraordinary circumstances, such as a posthumous award to a police officer who died in the performance of duties. It is, within the Canadian system of honours, the first and highest of the exemplary service medals.

Appearance
The Police Exemplary Service Medal is circular in shape,  in diameter and made of silver-coloured metal.  The obverse of the medal depicts a maple leaf with the scales of justice superimposed upon the center.  Circumscribed around the medal are the words "Exemplary Service ".  The areas between the edge of the medal and the maple leaf are cut out.  The reverse depicts the crowned cypher of the monarch.  The recipient's name is engraved on the edge of the medal.

The medal is suspended by a stylized inverted fleur-de-lis on a straight suspension bar.

Each additional 10-year period of full-time service may qualify recipients for award of a bar to the medal.  The bar is silver and bears a stylized maple leaf.  When only wearing the ribbon bar, a small silver maple leaf is pinned upon it to represent award of the bar.

References

External links

Civil awards and decorations of Canada
Law enforcement awards and honors
Long service medals
Law enforcement in Canada
Long and Meritorious Service Medals of Britain and the Commonwealth